Charles Cleveland Poole (March 22, 1892 – May 21, 1931) was an American musician, singer and banjo player, as well as the leader of the North Carolina Ramblers, which was a string band that recorded many popular songs between 1925 and 1930.

Biography
Poole was born near the mill town of Franklinville, North Carolina, United States. He was the son of John Philip Poole and Elizabeth Johnson. In 1918, he moved to the town of Spray, now part of Eden. He learned banjo as a youth. He played baseball, and his three-fingered technique was the result of an accident. Whilst betting that he could catch a baseball without a glove, the ball broke his thumb as he closed his hand too soon, resulting in a permanent arch in his right hand.

Poole bought his first banjo, an Orpheum No. 3 Special, with profits from making moonshine. Later, he appeared in the 1929 catalog of the Gibson Company, promoting their banjo.

He spent much of his adult life working in textile mills.

The North Carolina Ramblers 

Poole and his brother-in-law, fiddle player Posey Rorer, whom he had met in West Virginia in 1917 and whose sister he married, formed a trio with guitarist Norman Woodlief they called the North Carolina Ramblers. They auditioned in New York for Columbia Records. After landing a contract, they recorded the successful "Don't Let Your Deal Go Down Blues" on July 27, 1925. This song sold over 106,000 copies at a time when there were estimated to be only 6,000 phonographs in the southern United States, according to Poole's biographer and great-nephew, Kinney Rorer. The band was paid $75 for the session.

For the next five years, Poole and the Ramblers were a popular band. The band's sound remained consistent, although several members came and left (including Posey Rorer and Norm Woodlief). The band recorded over 60 songs for Columbia Records during the 1920s, including "Sweet Sunny South", "White House Blues", "He Rambled", and "Take a Drink on Me". Former railroad engineer Roy Harvey was one of the guitarists. Fiddlers in various recording sessions were Posey Rorer, Lonnie Austin and Odell Smith.

Bill C. Malone, in his history of country music, Country Music, U.S.A., says, "The Rambler sound was predictable: a bluesy fiddle lead, backed up by long, flowing, melodic guitar runs and the finger-style banjo picking of Poole. Predictable as it may be, it was nonetheless outstanding. No string band in early country music equaled the Ramblers' controlled, clean, well-patterned sound."

Poole composed few, if any, of his recordings. Nevertheless, his dynamic renditions were popular with a broad audience in the Southeast United States. He is considered a primary source for old-time music revivalists and aficionados. Songs like "Bill Morgan and His Gal", "Milwaukee Blues", and "Leavin' Home", have been resurrected by banjo players. Poole developed a unique fingerpicking style, a blend of melody, arpeggio, and rhythm (distinct from clawhammer/frailing and Scruggs' variations).

Poole had been invited to Hollywood to play background music for a film, but died before getting there. He died after a heart attack due to alcohol poisoning in May 1931. According to some reports, he had been disheartened by the slump in record sales due to the Depression.

Legacy
Poole's music saw a revival in the 1960s, most likely due to his inclusion on the 1952 Anthology of American Folk Music, and his renditions have been re-recorded by numerous artists, such as John Mellencamp with "White House Blues", The Chieftains, New Lost City Ramblers, Holy Modal Rounders and Hot Tuna with "Hesitation Blues", and Joan Baez with "Sweet Sunny South". The Grateful Dead's popular song "Deal" was influenced by "Don't Let Your Deal Go Down". His recordings have also appeared on numerous compilations of old-time music. Since 1995, Poole's legacy has been carried on every year in Eden, North Carolina during the month of June when the Piedmont Folk Legacies, Inc, a non-profit organization, hosts the Charlie Poole Music Festival. Bob Dylan in his Nobel Lecture acknowledged Poole and several lyrics of his song "You Ain't Talkin To Me".

Columbia issued a three-CD box set of his music, entitled You Ain't Talkin' to Me: Charlie Poole and the Roots of Country Music in 2005. The album, produced by Henry "Hank" Sapoznik, was nominated for three Grammy Awards. It chronicles the music made for Columbia by Poole and the North Carolina Ramblers between 1925 and 1931, including such important songs as "Don't Let Your Deal Go Down", "Can I Sleep in Your Barn Tonight, Mister?", "Old and Only in the Way" (the title of which was used by Jerry Garcia to name his 1970s bluegrass band with David Grisman, Old and in the Way), and "White House Blues", adapted by John Mellencamp, who in 2004 updated the politically charged lyrics and changed the title to "To Washington". In addition to 43 of Poole's original recordings, the package features performances by other early roots music players and singers, including Fred Van Eps, Arthur Collins, Billy Murray, Floyd Country Ramblers, Uncle Dave Macon and The Red Fox Chasers.

The original liner notes, by Peter Stampfel, state, "Charlie Poole and the North Carolina Ramblers recorded an incredible number of songs that are personal favorites of mine. Poole is, in fact, one of the great musicians of the century. No doubt about it." The album's cover art was created by Robert Crumb, the celebrated illustrator and an old-time music aficionado.

Kinney Rorer penned a biography of Charlie Poole, entitled Ramblin' Blues: The Life and Songs of Charlie Poole in 1982. Rorer is a descendant of Poole's fiddler Posey Rorer, and is the banjo player for the old-time music group The New North Carolina Ramblers.

A double-CD album paying tribute to Poole was released by singer-songwriter Loudon Wainwright III in August 2009. The album, entitled High Wide & Handsome: The Charlie Poole Project, features 30 tracks, including new versions of songs originally recorded by Poole, as well as tunes composed by Wainwright and producer Dick Connette on the artist's life and times; it was awarded the Grammy Award for Best Traditional Folk Album at the 52nd Annual Grammy Awards.

Discography

Compilations
 Charlie Poole and the Highlanders: The Complete Paramount and Brunswick Recordings 1929 (Tompkins Square Records, April 20, 2013)

References

Bibliography
Stars of Country Music, (University of Illinois Press, 1975)
The Online Discographical Project Retrieved on December 18, 2008.

External links

List of Charlie Poole songs
Charlie Poole at the Internet Archive
 

American banjoists
American country singer-songwriters
Country musicians from North Carolina
Old-time musicians
1892 births
1931 deaths
People from Eden, North Carolina
20th-century American singers
Singer-songwriters from North Carolina
People from Randolph County, North Carolina
20th-century American male musicians
American male singer-songwriters